A list of films produced in the United Kingdom in 1986 (see 1986 in film):

1986

See also
1986 in British music
1986 in British radio
1986 in British television
1986 in the United Kingdom

References

External links

1986
Films
Lists of 1986 films by country or language